The N. N. Andreyev Acoustics Institute, (also the Andreyev Acoustics Institute or simply the Acoustics Institute) is a Russian research facility dedicated to the study of acoustics. It was established in 1953 in Moscow, as part of the Lebedev Physical Institute of the Academy of Sciences of the USSR. It is named after its founder, Nikolay N. Andreyev.

External links
Andreyev Acoustics Institute website
Andreyev Acoustics Institute history

Research institutes in the Soviet Union
1953 establishments in the Soviet Union
Research institutes established in 1953